Coleman Hawkins Plays Make Someone Happy from Do Re Mi is an album by saxophonist Coleman Hawkins which was recorded in 1962 and released on the Moodsville label., featuring tracks from the 1960 broadway musicals Do Re Mi.

Reception

Allmusic awarded the album 3 stars.

Track listing 
 "Wouldn't It Be Loverly" (Alan Jay Lerner, Frederick Loewe) - 7:45
 "Cry Like the Wind" (Jule Styne, Betty Comden, Adolph Green) - 4:30
 "Climb Ev'ry Mountain" (Richard Rodgers, Oscar Hammerstein II) - 4:29
 "Make Someone Happy" (Styne, Comden, Green) - 3:03
 "Out of My Dreams" (Rodgers, Hammerstein) - 4:48
 "Have I Told You Lately?" (Harold Rome) - 3:22
 "I Believe In You" (Frank Loesser) - 4:42

Personnel 
Coleman Hawkins - tenor saxophone
Tommy Flanagan - piano
Major Holley - bass
Eddie Locke - drums

References 

Coleman Hawkins albums
1962 albums
Moodsville Records albums
Albums recorded at Van Gelder Studio
Albums produced by Esmond Edwards